Ultimate Brain Games is a game developed by Cosmigo and published by Telegames for the Nintendo DS, Game Boy Advance, and PlayStation platforms. It contains several thinking games, such as Chess and Checkers.

Games
It features eight different games.
Chess
Checkers
Backgammon
Dominoes
Reversi
Sink Ships (Battleship)
Four-in-a-row (Connect Four)
Shanghai (Mahjong solitaire)

Reception
The Game Boy Advance version was nominated for IGN strategy game of the year, IGN described the game "a great assortment of little games" giving it a rating of 8.5/10.

See also

Ultimate Card Games

References

2003 video games
Game Boy Advance games
Multiplayer and single-player video games
Nintendo DS games
PlayStation (console) games
Puzzle video games
Telegames games
Video games developed in Germany
Cosmigo games